Shahrabad Rural District may refer to:

Shahrabad Rural District (Razavi Khorasan Province)
Shahrabad Rural District (Firuzkuh County), Tehran province